Chalelu (also Romanized as Chālelū; also known as Chālī) is a village in Gavdul-e Sharqi Rural District, in the Central District of Malekan County, East Azerbaijan Province, Iran. At the 2006 census, its population was 42, in 10 families.

References 

Populated places in Malekan County